The Ugly Ones (es: El precio de un hombre, lit. "The Price of a Man", it: The Bounty Killer, later La morte ti segue... ma non ha fretta, lit. "Death follows you... but not in a hurry") is a 1966 Spanish-Italian Spaghetti Western film directed by Eugenio Martín.

The film marked the debut of Tomás Milián in the western genre and was the first film score of composer Stelvio Cipriani. It was also the first Spanish western to receive a state funding for the "artistic interest of the work". The film was based on the 1958 novel The Bounty Killer by Marvin H. Albert.

It was shown as part of a retrospective on Spaghetti Western at the 64th Venice International Film Festival. On October 11, 2017 Eugenio Martín was honored for the fiftieth anniversary of this at the 7º Almería Western Film Festival.

Plot
The notorious bounty hunter, Luke Chilson, pursues Mexican fugitive Jose Gomez. He follows him through the desert and arrives in a Mexican village where Gomez manages to turn the peasants against his pursuer. Unaware of the danger, Chilson finds himself trapped.

Cast

References

External links

1966 films
1966 Western (genre) films
Spaghetti Western films
Spanish Western (genre) films
Films shot in Almería
Films scored by Stelvio Cipriani
Films based on Western (genre) novels
United Artists films
1960s Italian films